Kapulukaya Dam is an embankment dam on the Kızılırmak River in Kırıkkale Province, Turkey. The development was backed by the Turkish State Hydraulic Works.

See also

List of dams and reservoirs in Turkey

References
DSI, State Hydraulic Works (Turkey), Retrieved December 16, 2009

Dams in Kırıkkale Province
Hydroelectric power stations in Turkey
Dams completed in 1979
Kızılırmak